Prasiddha Narayan Singh (born 1903) was a Bhojpuri writer, poet, and a freedom fighter. He is known for his patriotic and encouraging poems. Jawaharlal Nehru appreciated his poem Jawahar Swagat on his visit of Ballia during the freedom movement.

Life 
He was born in 1903 at Chitbara village in Ballia district of the United Provinces of Agra and Oudh. His father was Jagmohan Singh. In his earlier days, He was a worker in Mestan high school and later left the job and started property dealing. After that he joined Indian National Congress and started his political career. He also worked as a freedom fighter and took part in the independence struggle.

Works

Bhojpuri 
Balidani Ballia (Book)
Jawahar Swagat (Poem)

Hindi 
Ballia Jile ke Kavi aur Lekhak (Book)
Dorup (poem)

References

1903 births
Indian poets
Year of death missing